Yaroslavtsev Log is a rural locality (a selo) and the administrative center of Yaroslav-Logovskoy Selsoviet, Rodinsky District, Altai Krai, Russia. The population was 756 as of 2013. There are 7 streets.

Geography 
Yaroslavtsev Log is located 28 km south of Rodino (the district's administrative centre) by road. Novokormikha is the nearest rural locality.

References 

Rural localities in Rodinsky District